The Sveti Sedmochislenitsi Church and formerly The Black Mosque is a Bulgarian Orthodox church in Sofia, the capital of Bulgaria. It was created between 1901 and 1902 as an Ottoman mosque later converted into orthodox Church, and was inaugurated on 27 July 1903. The church is named after Cyril and Methodius and their five disciples, known in the Orthodox Church collectively as the Sedmochislenitsi.

History 

The Black Mosque was completed around the year 1547. The mosque was commissioned by Sofu Mehmed Pasha, former governor-general of Rumelia, to Mimar Sinan. By the time of the inauguration of the mosque, Sofu Mehmed Pasha has raised to the rank of vizier. It was constructed at the place of a former nunnery of the Rila Monastery and an Early Christian temple from the 4th-5th century, the ruins of which were excavated in 1901. An even older construction, a pagan temple of Asclepius from Roman Serdica, was also discovered in the mosque's foundations.

The mosque received its more popular name, the Black Mosque, after the dark granite from which its minaret was made. The minaret collapsed during an earthquake in the 19th century and the mosque was abandoned by the Ottomans after the Liberation of Bulgaria in 1878 to become used as a military warehouse and prison.

The architect who suggested the conversion of the once Ottoman mosque into a Christian church was the Russian Alexander Pomerantsev, responsible for the Upper Trade Rows on Red Square, among other buildings. The Bulgarian architects Yordan Milanov and Petko Momchilov designed the dome, the narthex and the bell tower in a traditional Bulgarian style, inspired by the movement of Romanticism. Only the central hall and the dome of the former mosque were preserved, with four oval bays, a narthex and an altar section being added.

The construction works took a year, between 27 May 1901 and 6 May 1902, but the complete inner decoration did not finish until 1996. Young artists painted the icons and among the first donors were Tsar Ferdinand (recognized as the primary church donor in 1905) and Ivan Evstratiev Geshov. Famous Bulgarian statesman Petko Karavelov also contributed significantly to the church's construction and was buried nearby in January 1903.

Architecture 

The 25 m-long mosque had a square shape and a large lead-covered dome. The mosque was also known as the İmaret Mosque after the imaret, a kitchen for the poor located in the vicinity, the ruins of which were found in 1912. A madrasah, a Muslim religious school, was located in what is now the small garden between the modern church and the Count Ignatiev School. The madrasah was later used as a prison after the Liberation of Bulgaria. Other Ottoman constructions nearby included a caravanserai and a hammam.

The large candlesticks in front of the altar were cast in 1903 from obsolete police badges from Eastern Rumelia and the Principality of Bulgaria (i.e. before the Unification in 1885). An electric clock, still in use, was created by the noted watchmaker Georgi Hadzhinikolov and fit to the western façade in the 1930s. The small garden and the square close to the church were also built in the period.

In the grounds of the Sveti Sedmochislenitsi is buried alongside his wife Petko Stoichev Karavelov (Bulgarian: Петко Каравелов) (24 March 1843 – 24 January 1903) a leading Bulgarian liberal politician, who served as Prime Minister on four occasions.

See also 
List of churches in Sofia

References

External links

 Sveti Sedmochislenitsi Church website 
Sveti Sedmochislenitsi Church, Archnet

Churches completed in 1528
16th-century mosques
Sedmochislenitsi
Churches completed in 1902
20th-century Eastern Orthodox church buildings
Former mosques in Bulgaria
Churches converted from mosques
Church buildings with domes
Mimar Sinan buildings